Montelepre is a town and comune in the Metropolitan City of Palermo, Sicily, Italy. It is known for having been the native city of Sicilian bandit Salvatore Giuliano, of architect Rosario Candela, as well as the ancestral homeland of the American singer, actor, and congressman Sonny Bono, whose father Santo Bono was born in the town. Montelepre was also the native town of Lino Saputo, founder of the multi billion Canadian firm Saputo, Inc.

Main sights
The Church of Maria Santissima del Rosario

References 

Municipalities of the Metropolitan City of Palermo